Roberto Carlos Palacios Mestas (born December 28, 1972) is a Peruvian retired footballer who played as a midfielder.

Palacios is Peru's record cap holder and played most of his career for Sporting Cristal, which was the team he started his career and later retired with at the end of the 2011 season.

Early life 
Roberto Palacios grew up in the Chorrillos District in Lima. Palacios was introduced to soccer at an early age by his soccer-loving dad, and he played on regional teams in his early years .

Club career
Palacios became a player of Sporting Cristal, where he played in his youth. Palacios made his debut with Sporting Cristal in 1991, when his team faced Deportivo Municipal in late October 1991. Palacios then scored his first goal in the following week against Universitario de Deportes. Palacios was a successful player, and scored many goals for both his clubs and the National Team.

He is nicknamed "El Chorrillano" or "Chorri". He was regarded, at his peak, by some as one of the best Peruvian players of the 90's. In Peru, Palacios has only played for one club, Sporting Cristal. Outside of Peru he has played for several clubs such as Puebla F.C. (Mexico), Cruzeiro Esporte Clube (Brasil), Universidad Autónoma de Guadalajara (Mexico), Monarcas Morelia (Mexico), Deportivo Cali (Colombia) and Liga Deportiva Universitaria de Quito from Ecuador. While playing for LDU Quito, "Chorri" was involved in a fight and got suspended. This was caused because he scored a chalaca goal.

International career
"Chorri" was well known for his amazing 'chorrigolazos' (for his ability to surprise top goalkeepers by scoring from far away  despite his small size) which nearly took Peru to the last 3 FIFA World Cups. Palacios had a long run with the Peru national football team that resulted in a record 128 caps and 19 goals for his country.  He retired from the Peruvian National squad on May 25, 2012.

Outside football
Roberto Palacios and his father were part of the Million Man March.

Palacios is also a children's activist.  He frequently works with UNICEF to help feed the poor children of Africa, and sometimes even by flying over and donating football gear and accessories.  He recently donated a fair share of money to the UNEP to help the people of Haiti in the wake of the tragic 2010 earthquake.

Honours

Club
Sporting Cristal
Primera División Peruana: 1991, 1994, 1995, 1996

LDU Quito
Serie A de Ecuador: 2005

International
Peru
Kirin Cup: 1999

Individual
Peruvian Player on the Year: 1994, 1995, 1996

See also
 List of men's footballers with 100 or more international caps

References

External links

 
 Roberto Palacios at rsssf
 Roberto Palacios at delgol.com 

1972 births
Living people
Footballers from Lima
Association football midfielders
Peruvian footballers
Peru international footballers
FIFA Century Club
Sporting Cristal footballers
Club Puebla players
Cruzeiro Esporte Clube players
Tecos F.C. footballers
Atlético Morelia players
Atlas F.C. footballers
Deportivo Cali footballers
L.D.U. Quito footballers
Al Nassr FC players
Peruvian Primera División players
Liga MX players
Categoría Primera A players
Ecuadorian Serie A players
Saudi Professional League players
Expatriate footballers in Brazil
Peruvian expatriate sportspeople in Brazil
Expatriate footballers in Mexico
Peruvian expatriate sportspeople in Mexico
Expatriate footballers in Colombia
Peruvian expatriate sportspeople in Colombia
Expatriate footballers in Ecuador
Peruvian expatriate sportspeople in Ecuador
Expatriate footballers in Saudi Arabia
Peruvian expatriate sportspeople in Saudi Arabia
Peruvian expatriate footballers
1993 Copa América players
1995 Copa América players
1997 Copa América players
1999 Copa América players
2000 CONCACAF Gold Cup players
2004 Copa América players